728C Naval Air Squadron (728C NAS) was a Naval Air Squadron of the Royal Navy's Fleet Air Arm.

References

Citations

Bibliography

700 series Fleet Air Arm squadrons
Military units and formations established in 1958
1958 establishments in the United Kingdom